The Hammarskjöld family, also known as Hammarskiöld family, is a Swedish noble family, enrolled in Riddarhuset (English: "House of Nobility") with the number of 135.

Background

The founder of the family was Peder Mikaelsson (c. 1560–1646), the Governor of Borgholm Castle. He fought for King Sigismund at Stångebro in 1598 and was knighted in 1610 with the name of Hammarskiöld. He was married twice.  His first wife was Beata Körning, daughter of the slottslov ("castle commander") Erik Matsson Körning and Kjerstin Hand. His second wife, a cousin of Beata, was Christina Stjerna, the daughter of Peder Månsson Stjerna (number 77 in Riddarhuset) and Karin Hand. The two marriages produced children but the issue from his first wife went out early on the "sword side" (svärdssidan, literally "on the side of the sword" meaning without any male heirs).

As early as 1607 Peder Mikaelsson Hammarskiöld received as his properties the manors in the present Oskarshamn Municipality – Misterhult, Virbo and Fårbo – and, in the present Vimmerby Municipality, Tuna, all in the modern Kalmar County for providing five fully armed men for the defense.  Tuna is still a family estate for the Hammarskjölds, and the church there houses the family mausoleum for them. The family was introduced to Riddarhuset in 1628. The son of the second marriage, Major Arvid Hammarskjöld, married Anna Dorothea Patkull. The Hammarskjöld dynasty continued with their son, Colonel Carl Gustaf Hammarskjöld, who married Baroness Hedvig Ulfsparre of Broxvik, whose mother belonged to the Stake family (number 47 in Riddarhuset).

A younger branch of the family has been partners and managing directors of Skultuna Messingbruk, a Swedish manufacturer of cuff links in Skultuna near Västerås in Västmanland, by intermarriage with the Adlerwald family. In 2014, there were 61 people who bear the Hammarskjöld or Hammarskiöld surname in Sweden.

Notable members of the family 

 (c. 1560–1646), Swedish soldier
Arvid Hammarsköld (1626–1678), Swedish officer
Carl Gustaf Hammarsköld (1662–1729), Swedish officer
Carl Hammarsköld (1694–1774), Swedish officer
Mikael Hammarskjöld (1732–1802), Swedish hovjägmästare
Vilhelm Hammarskjöld (1780–1843), Swedish factory manager
Peder Hjalmar Hammarskjöld (1817–1861), Swedish manager of Surahammars Bruk
Emilie Hammarskjöld, née Holmberg (1821–1854), Swedish-American composer, singer, pianist, music teacher and organist, wife of Peder Hjalmar from the Skultana branch
Carl Gustaf Hammarsköld (1729–1799), Swedish officer and chamberlain
Arvid Hammarskiöld (1787–1866), Swedish officer
Per Teodor Hammarskiöld (1819–1908), Swedish officer
Ludvig Hammarskiöld (1869–1958), Swedish general, cousin of Hjalmar
Karin Augusta Sofia Hammarskjöld (1897–1975), Swedish businesswoman
Per Arvid Magnus Hammarskiöld (1899–1988), Swedish engineer
Hans Hammarskiöld (1925–2012), Swedish photographer
Sven Ludvig Hammarskiöld (1901–1983), Swedish judge
Gerd Hammarskiöld (born 1926), Swedish librarian
Eva Hamilton (b. 1954), Swedish journalist and since 2006 CEO of Sveriges Television
Göran Hammarskjöld (1906–1969), Swedish officer
 (1912–1974), Swedish banker
Lorenzo Hammarsköld (1785–1827), Swedish author
Carl Åke Hammarskjöld (1768–1848), Swedish Groom of the Chamber
Carl Leonard Hammarskjöld (1807–1878), Swedish officer
Åke Hugo Hammarskjöld (1845–1937), Swedish architect and farmer
Carl Olof Hammarskjöld (1880–1949), Swedish lawyer
Sven Olof Hammarskjöld (1909–1993), Swedish physician
 (born 1942), Swedish officer
 (1838–1898), Minister of Education for Sweden (1880–1888)
Hugo Hammarskjöld (1845–1937), Minister of Education for Sweden (1906–1909), brother of Carl
Knut Vilhelm Hammarskjöld (1818–1891), Swedish officer
Carl Gustaf Waldemar Hammarskjöld (1865–1940), Swedish officer
Carl Gustaf Fredrik Knut Hammarskjöld (1904–1994), Swedish engineer and officer
 (born 1934)
Hjalmar Hammarskjöld (1862–1953), Prime Minister of Sweden (1914–1917), cousin of Carl and Hugo
 (1891–1974), Governor of Södermanland (1935–1958) and State Secretary for Sweden, son of Hjalmar
Claes Åke Hjalmar Hammarskjöld (born 1924), Swedish county director
Åke Hammarskjöld (1893–1937), Swedish civil servant and diplomat, son of Hjalmar, brother of Bo and Dag
 (1922–2012), Swedish diplomat
 (born 1954), Swedish diplomat
 (1923–1994), Swedish diplomat
 (born 1967), Swedish diplomat
Michaël Olof Hjalmar Åkesson (1929–2001), Swedish Secretary of the House of Nobility
Sten Hjalmar Fridolf Knut Hammarskjöld (1900–1972), Swedish journalist, author
Dag Hammarskjöld (1905–1961), Secretary-General of the United Nations, son of Hjalmar and brother of Åke and Bo
Carl Gustaf Hammarskjöld (1865–1940), Secretary of Defense for Sweden (1920–1921), brother of Hjalmar and cousin of Carl and Hugo
Carl Gustaf Fredrik Knut Hammarskjöld (1904–1994), Swedish engineer
Bengt Gustaf Hjalmar Hammarskjöld (1905–1997)

References 

  Svenskt biografiskt lexikon [ Swedish Biographical Dictionary ]
  [Johan] Gabriel Anrep, "Adel ätten [ Noble family of ] Hammarsköld, N:o 135", Svenska adelns Ättar-taflor [ Pedigree Tables of the Swedish Nobility ], Volume 2 (Stockholm:  P. A. Norstedt & Söner, 1861), pages 191-195
  Statistics Sweden [ Statistiska centralbyrån ], “Namesearch.  How many are named...?", results obtained 4 January 2014.

Swedish noble families
Political families